Palpita isoscelalis is a moth in the family Crambidae. It was described by Achille Guenée in 1854. It is found in South America (including Brazil) and on the Antilles (including Guadeloupe, the Grenadines, Saint Martin, Puerto Rico, Cuba).

The wingspan is about 24 mm. Adults have translucent wings.

Subspecies
Palpita isoscelalis isoscelalis
Palpita isoscelalis gourbeyrensis Munroe, 1959 (French West Indies: Guadeloupe)

References

Moths described in 1854
Palpita
Moths of the Caribbean
Moths of South America